Ticineto is a comune (municipality) in the Province of Alessandria in the Italian region Piedmont, located about  east of Turin and about  north of Alessandria.

Ticineto borders the following municipalities: Borgo San Martino, Frassineto Po, Pomaro Monferrato, and Valmacca.

References

Cities and towns in Piedmont